Science Fiction is the second album by the German indie rock quartet Blackmail. Following up their debut release in 1997, Science Fiction was more openly accepted and liked. It also accumulated quite a large number of fans, which was a beginning of a more solid career for Blackmail.

Track listing
 "Londerla" – 3:07
 "Dull" – 2:33
 "Feeble Bee" – 4:52
 "Gone Too Soon Too Far" – 2:49
 "The Fjords of Zimbabwe" – 4:59
 "Mu" – 5:28
 "Dental Research '72" – 7:53
 "Nostra" – 2:50
 "Smoke Gutter" – 4:49
 "Iodine" – 2:34
 "3, 000, 000 Years From Here" – 3:18
 "Soon Too Far Gone Far" – 4:22

Personnel
Aydo Abay – vocals
Kurt Ebelhäuser – guitars, backing vocals, keyboards
Carlos Ebelhäuser – bass
Mario Matthias – drums

Do Robots Dream of Electric Sheep?

Do Robots Dream of Electric Sheep? is a remixed version of Science Fiction, similar to Linkin Park's Reanimation.  It was released on February 4, 2000.  The name of the album is a play on the title of Philip K. Dick's science fiction novel Do Androids Dream of Electric Sheep?

Track listing 
 "Londerla" (Killer Loop remix) – 5:06
 "Dull" (Darkipher remix) – 4:17
 "Feeble Bee" (Peppermint remix) – 3:55
 "Gone Too Soon Too Far" (Soon Too Double Far Gone remix) – 4:59
 "The Fjords of Zimbabwe" (Evil Fishing remix) – 4:06
 "Mu" (Flutes Are No Instruments-version) – 5:04
 "Dental Research '72" (The Song Formerly Known as Nostra-mix) – 3:59
 "Nostra" (Zipped Close remix) – 5:22
 "Smoke Gutter" (G.I.D. is a DJ remix) – 4:35
 "Iodine" (Reperformed by Scumbucket) – 5:12
 "3, 000, 000 Years From Here" (If Goth Is Around the Corner remix) – 6:15
 "When I Met Bon I Changed the Tempi" – 2:11
 "Soon Too Far Gone Far" (Slowfuck-version) – 5:08
 "3, 000, 000 Years From Here" (Space Madison remix) – 9:59
 "Stabilo Pink" (Performed by Der Weltraumbruder) – 3:20

References

External links 
 
 

1999 albums
Blackmail (band) albums